Underneath is the third album by American pop rock group Hanson. It was released in 2004 by 3CG Records. It is the band's first release on their own independent record label.  The making of the album was the main subject in Hanson's documentary film, Strong Enough to Break, that follows the band during the recording process and the struggles they faced to release it.

Worldwide sales
To date, the album has sold more than 350,000 copies, 137,000 of which were US sales and around 17,000 of which were sold in the UK, making this their lowest-selling official release. Despite this, the lead single "Penny & Me" achieved some success, reaching number 2 on the Hot 100 Singles Sales chart and number 10 on the UK Top 40. The second single, "Lost Without Each Other", did not chart in most countries, and only reached number 39 on the UK Top 40. Hanson themselves have said that they endured a financial loss in making and releasing the album, to the point where in some places, the album itself transitioned from mainstream retail locations to discount stores, particularly across the UK. It has been speculated that any loss endured has been made up from tour proceeds, as they tend to generate more direct income for bands than record sales can.

Track listing
All songs written by Isaac Hanson, Taylor Hanson and Zac Hanson; additional writers in parentheses.
Lead vocals by Taylor Hanson, except where noted.

 "Strong Enough to Break" (Greg Wells) – 3:32
 "Dancin' in the Wind" – 4:04
 "Penny & Me" – 4:03
 "Underneath" (Matthew Sweet) – 4:40
 "Misery" – 3:08 (Lead vocals: Zac Hanson)
 "Lost Without Each Other" (Gregg Alexander) – 3:44
 "When You're Gone" – 4:31
 "Broken Angel" – 4:49 (Lead vocals: Zac Hanson)
 "Deeper" – 4:10 (Lead vocals: Isaac Hanson)
 "Get Up and Go" – 4:08
 "Crazy Beautiful" – 4:02
 "Hey" (Greg Wells) – 4:17
 "Believe" – 12:17

French version bonus track
 "Someone (Laissons nous une chance)" (featuring Emma Daumas) (Damon Lee, Dominique Grimaldi, Emma Daumas)

Australian bonus tracks (live from House of Blues, Chicago)
 "If Only"
"I Will Come to You" (Barry Mann, Cynthia Weil)

Japanese bonus tracks
 "Dream Girl"
"I Almost Care" (Matthew Sweet)
"With You in Your Dreams" (live)

Notes:
"Hey" was featured on the sixth episode "A Birthday Witch" from the sixth season of the series Sabrina, the Teenage Witch.
"Believe" includes the hidden tracks "Crazy Beautiful (Reprise)" and "Lulla Belle".
The Japanese version does not include "Get Up and Go".

Personnel
 Taylor Hanson – vocals, piano, keyboards, organ, production, art concept
 Isaac Hanson – vocals, acoustic guitar, electric guitar, production, mixing, Pro Tools engineer, art concept
 Zac Hanson – vocals, drums, percussion, piano, production, art concept
 Michelle Branch – guest vocals on "Deeper"
 Dave Ashton – Pro Tools engineer
 P.R. Brown – art direction, art design, photography
 Joe Chiccarelli – lead engineer, mixing
 Steve Churchyard – mixing
 Luis Conte – percussion
 Todd Edwards – art concept
 John Goodmanson – mixing
 Danny Kortchmar – production
 George Marino – mastering
 Justin Meldal-Johnsen – bass
 Steve Ripley – mixing
 Steve Thompson – mixing
 Greg Wells – bass, acoustic guitar, production
 Sam Farrar – bass
 Abraham Laboriel – bass on "Penny & Me"

Charts

References

External links
 

Hanson (band) albums
2004 albums
Albums produced by Greg Wells
Cooking Vinyl albums